The 51st Annual Japan Record Awards took place on December 30, 2009. TBS broadcast the event, which will take place again at New National Theatre in Shibuya, Tokyo. The nominations for the Awards were announced on December 1.

Awards winners 
 Japan Record Award:  - "Someday"
 Artist: Exile
 Songwriter: ATSUSHI
 Composer: miwa furuse
 Arranger: H-Wonder
 Record companies: Avex Entertainment
 Productions: LDH
 Best Vocal Performance: Hiroshi Itsuki
 Best New Artist: Big Bang
 Best album: GReeeeN for "Shio, Koshō"

Nominees

Japan Record Awards 
 Ikimono-gakari for "YELL"
 w-inds. x G-Dragon (Big Bang) for "Rain Is Fallin'"
 Exile for "Someday"
 Girl Next Door for "Infinity"
 Daisuke Kitagawa for "Omae o Tsurete (おまえを連れて)"
 Kumi Koda for "Lick me♥"
 Fuyumi Sakamoto for "Mata Kimi ni Koishiteru (また君に恋してる)"
 Tohoshinki for "Stand by U"
 Kiyoshi Hikawa for "Tokimeki no Rumba (ときめきのルンバ)"
 Ryoichi Higuchi for "Tegami: Shin'ai naru Kodomotachi e (手紙〜親愛なる子供たちへ〜)"
 Kaori Mizumori for "Aki no Miyajima (安芸の宮島)"

Best New Artist 
Maya Sakura
Scandal
Big Bang
Hilcrhyme

Special awards 
Alice
AKB48 and Yasushi Akimoto
Nobuyuki Tsujii
Michael Jackson

See also 
60th NHK Kōhaku Uta Gassen

References

External links
Official Website
Official results page

Japan Record Awards
Japan Record Awards
Japan Record Awards
Japan Record Awards
2009